The SNCF BB 16000 are a class of 25 kV 50 Hz AC electric locomotives produced by MTE. They are the AC version of the BB 9200.

Description 
This class of 62 locomotives was ordered in 1958 in order to equip the north east network with high speed locomotives capable of running at  under 25 kV-50 Hz single-phase catenary.
They are part of the large family of locomotives nicknamed BB Jacquemin, of which the BB 9200 were the first versions produced for 1.5 kV direct current operation, and developed using the results of speed tests carried out on the prototype series BB 9001-9002 and BB 9003–9004.

Design 
The electrical power equipment is directly derived from the first machines using Jacquemin concepts, the BB 12000: 25kV / 15kV auto-transformer, auxiliary transformer and traction transformer, rectifiers with ignitrons, later replaced by silicon diodes, and smoothing chokes, shunt resistors on the inductors of the 4 traction motors, and Arno three-phase converter to supply hotel power. The interesting improvement concerns the replacement of the mechanical camshaft controllers, as used on the BB 12000s, by Jeumont-Heidmann servomotors. The first 34 BB 16000s had provisional support for the AM 11 single-arm pantograph, similar to that fitted to BB 9400, except that the insulators are different for a single-phase machine. From BB 16035, the new reinforced support was installed, as used by BB 16500.

BB 16001 to 51 were delivered with a body similar to the first 21 BB 9200 locomotives, with short louvres. From BB 16052 the louvres were lengthened. There were some minor differences between the two sub-series, concerning the weight and the electrical equipment.

BB 16012 had additional ventilation louvres, which were provisionally installed to test the new silicon diode rectifier blocks. These were retained after the tests were concluded.

BB 16050 was the only push-pull fitted member of the class allocated to Corail never to have sported the Corail livery. It was fitted with the control cables and equipment while it was still in the mid-1970s green livery which it retained.

15 members of the class have been converted to class BB 16100 to operate VB2N sets in push-pull mode.

Service history 
The BB 16000s during their very long career have hauled most of the fast and express trains of the north, east, and north-west networks. With the progress of the 25 kV electrification, they quickly supplanted steam locomotives on services, from prestigious TEEs to interregional trains, and to certain fast freight trains.

Their versatility, their robustness, and their performance, have allowed certain members of the class to exceed 53 years of service and more than  traveled, which remains exceptional. The arrival of more modern and more powerful machines, of the BB 15000, BB 22200, BB 26000 classes did not lead, to their downgrading, because they still met the needs very well.

With the entry into service of the LGV Est in 2007, the transport offer has refocused around TGVs, freeing up many locomotives and imposing a reorganization of operating diagrams. A large number of BB 15000s were transferred from Strasbourg to Achères to operate Corail and TER services from Paris-Nord and Paris-Saint-Lazare. Some were modified for push-pull operation, quickly leading to the withdrawal of the BB 16100 classes used before and greatly reducing the use of the BB 16000s.

BB 16061 provided the last service of class to Paris-Saint-Lazare on 03/13/2010 with the haulage of a Paris - Le Havre train. The class, still managed by the Achères MPD, was assigned to Paris-La Chapelle for the operation of the Corail-Intercités (CIC), on diagrams common to the BB 15000s and the BB 22200s.

Withdrawals of the class occurred between 2009 and 2012, some units being parked on the Sotteville-lès-Rouen branch, an antechamber for upcoming demolition.

A celebration was organized by an association of retired drivers from the Aulnoye depot, on 24 November 2012, on the occasion of the 1637 Paris to Maubeuge train, hauled by BB 16029 decked out for the occasion. This involved a photoshoot at Paris-Nord  and live entertainment at Aulnoye-Aymeries station.

The last two locomotives kept in active service, BB 16029 and BB 16051, were regularly in use until 16 December 2012, hauling CIC services between Paris and Amiens and Paris and Maubeuge. The last six members of the class were withdrawn from service on 31 December 2012.

Route allocation 
Principle routes served were:
From Paris Saint Lazare:
 Rouen - Le Havre (last trip on March 13, 2010)
 Lisieux - Trouville-Deauville
 Caen - Cherbourg
From Paris Nord:
 Longueau - Amiens
 Lille - Tourcoing
 Arras - Dunkirk
 Aulnoye - Jeumont
 Tergnier - Saint-Quentin - Cambrai
 Compiègne - Saint-Quentin - Maubeuge (last trip on December 20, 2012)
From Paris Est:
 Nancy - Strasbourg
 Reims - Charleville-Mézières
Regional services:
 Lille - Amiens - Rouen (last trip 12 December 2004 - replacement by TER 2N)
 Strasbourg - Colmar - Mulhouse - Basel (international service)
 Metz - Thionville
 Thionville - Neufchâteau
Freight services:
 Noisy-Le-Sec - Lille-Champ de Mars
 Le Bourget - Aulnoye

Depot allocations 
 Initial allocation to La Chapelle from 1958, then transferred to Achères in October 1995)
 Lens (in 1958, then transfer to La Chapelle)
 Achères (from 1995)
 Strasbourg (from 1958 to 1962, then transfer to La Villette on June 1, 1962; return to Strasbourg on July 17, 1962, then transfer to La Chapelle from July 1973)

Modifications and liveries 
The BB 16000 have successively worn various liveries and underwent the following modifications:
 Original livery: light bluish green reinforced with a border at the bottom of the body and the louvres area in dark bluish green, as well as accessories in polished aluminum: "moustaches" in the shape of a wing under the bays and lamp surrounds connected from front to back by a line of grey paint; the coupling area is red;
 In the 1960s, the reinforcement of the cabins led to the elimination of the corner windows;
 Reinforced end cross members were installed at the expense of the coupling fairings and corner skirts were removed;
 From the 1970s, the handles of the cabin access doors were moved on all BB Jacquemin models: initially in the high position near the window, they were relocated to the bottom of the door in a recess which was previously used to pull the door close;
 End of the 1970s: installation of unified headlights and red lights;
 Corail Livery, created in 1977 by Jacques Beffara, consisting of a dark grey with roof and body part between headlights and lamp housings in light grey and a coral orange dividing strip emerging under the headlight surrounds, most of them had kept their aluminum surrounds;
 Concrete livery, introduced in 1985, without the aluminium detailing, grey with  a moustache under the front windows and a band surrounding the body painted in chamois, then in TGV orange TGV;
 The conversion to BB 16100 from 1991 is associated with a light grey livery with 3 areas in dark grey: the sill, the bay strip front and louvres and heavy low whiskers encompassing the front lights and overflowing onto the sides, finally an orange belt band between the side sills and whiskers. This livery was designed by Roger Tallon.
 Multiservice livery in 1995, dark grey, replaced in 2001 by storm grey, with roof, whiskers under bay windows and part metallic grey lower body, with a red line at mid-flank forming on the front faces a trapezoidal apron descending to the cross members, including the windows; it is this apron which bears the vehicle number, the moustache displaying the SNCF logo;
 Delivered with blue vinyl coating "En Voyage", from 2002.

Fleet list

Preservation 
 BB 16020 preserved by SNCF at Mohon.
 BB 16113 (ex 16030): preserved by SNCF at Mohon.

In popular culture 
 BB 16011 appears in the film Les Rois mages
 An unidentified member of the class appears in the film L'Auvergnat et l'Autobus
 BB 16020 was used in 1959 during the first live television broadcast from a train on the occasion of the inauguration of electric traction between Paris Nord and Lille.
 BB 16665 appears at the beginning of the film Deux Hommes dans la ville, directed by José Giovanni in 1973.

Models 
This locomotive was reproduced by the firms HOrnby-acHO, Jouef and Roco.

External links 
 Liste des bb16000

References

Notes

Bibliography
 
 
 Revue : .
 Mensuel : .
 Mensuel : .
 Mensuel : .

16000
Bo′Bo′ locomotives
MTE locomotives
Standard gauge electric locomotives of France
25 kV AC locomotives
Railway locomotives introduced in 1958
Passenger locomotives